Bartlett Creek is a creek in Lake County, California. It is a tributary of North Fork Cache Creek.

Description

At this point the creek undergoes a transition from a trout stream to a cyprinid and sucker stream.

The creek drains the Bartlett Management Area of the Mendocino National Forest.
The Köppen climate classification is Csb : Warm-summer Mediterranean climate.
Vegetation is mainly chamise and chaparral on the south slopes, and stands of timber on the ridgetops and north slopes.

Mineral springs

Bartlett Springs  is near the head of Bartlett Creek.

See also
Rivers of Lake County, California

Notes

Citations

Sources

 

Rivers of Lake County, California